Blabomma is a genus of araneomorph spiders in the family Cybaeidae, and was first described by R. V. Chamberlin & Wilton Ivie in 1937. Originally placed with the funnel weavers, it was moved to the Dictynidae in 1967, and to the Cybaeidae in 2017.

Species
 it contains eleven species:
Blabomma californicum (Simon, 1895) (type) – USA
Blabomma flavipes Chamberlin & Ivie, 1937 – USA
Blabomma foxi Chamberlin & Ivie, 1937 – USA
Blabomma guttatum Chamberlin & Ivie, 1937 – USA
Blabomma hexops Chamberlin & Ivie, 1937 – USA
Blabomma lahondae (Chamberlin & Ivie, 1937) – USA
Blabomma oregonense Chamberlin & Ivie, 1937 – USA
Blabomma sanctum Chamberlin & Ivie, 1937 – USA
Blabomma sylvicola (Chamberlin & Ivie, 1937) – USA
Blabomma uenoi Paik & Yaginuma, 1969 – Korea
Blabomma yosemitense Chamberlin & Ivie, 1937 – USA

References

External links
Blabomma at BugGuide

Araneomorphae genera
Cybaeidae
Dictynidae
Spiders of Asia
Spiders of the United States